Vera Louise Holmøy (born 27 April 1931) is a Norwegian judge.

She was born in Oslo. She was hired in the Ministry of Justice and the Police in 1957, became assisting secretary in 1965 and  deputy under-secretary of State in 1974. She was a Supreme Court Justice from 1976 to 2001.

She is married to judge Tor Holmøy.

References

1931 births
Living people
Judges from Oslo
Supreme Court of Norway justices